The Chaldean Catholic Eparchy of Saint Thomas the Apostle is in Sydney, Australia, and is immediately subject to the Holy See. The bishop was formerly Djibrail Kassab, appointed in 2006. His bishopric currently sits as St. Thomas the Apostle Chaldean Catholic Church, Bossley Park, New South Wales.

Archbishop Kasab was based in Basrah Iraq before he was posted to Oceania. In 2015, he was succeeded by Archbishop Amel Shamon Nona.

As of 2014, the eparchy contains 35,000 Catholics.  Nine priests serve a total of seven parishes.

Churches and Parishes 
St.Thomas Chaldean Catholic Church, Bossley Park, New South Wales, Australia
St. Mary's Assumption Chaldean Catholic Church, Fairfield, New South Wales, Australia
St. Joseph Chaldean Catholic Church, Mount Druitt, New South Wales, Australia
St. George Chaldean Catholic Church, Campbellfield, Victoria, Australia
Our Lady Guardian of Plants Chaldean Catholic Church, Campbellfield, Victoria, Australia
St Addai Chaldean Catholic Church, Manukau, Auckland, New Zealand

See also

 Roman Catholicism in Australia

References

External links

GCatholic.org

Chaldean Catholic dioceses
Catholic Church in Australia
2006 establishments in Australia
Christian organizations established in 2006
Eastern Catholic dioceses in Oceania